Cape Wiles is a headland located on the west side of the southern tip of Eyre Peninsula in South Australia about  south west of the city of Port Lincoln. The cape also is the western extremity of Sleaford Bay.

Name
Cape Wiles was named by Matthew Flinders on 19 February 1802 after James Wiles, a botanist whom he described as “a worthy friend at Liguanea, in Jamaica”, along with the nearby Liguanea Island. Wiles had been a friend of Joseph Banks then  became First Gardener on the Second Breadfruit Voyage (1791–1793) under William Bligh and Flinders had been a midshipman on the same voyage. He left the ship in Jamaica and became gardener at a public nursery, then Island Botanist. He later owned two coffee plantations. Wiles was a beneficiary of slavery from the British West Indies. The slaves on his plantations had been valued at £4,160.

Uses
The cape is the site of a high frequency radar station which is used to collect data about wind direction and wave height.  Since 2012, the waters adjoining its shoreline are within a habitat protection zone in the Thorny Passage Marine Park.

References

External links
Cape Wiles - video by Cy Starkman

r
Eyre Peninsula
Great Australian Bight